Couple's Retreat Garden (Suzhou Wu: Ngeu yoe) located in Suzhou city, Jiangsu province, China is a famous classical Chinese garden. It is recognized with other classical Suzhou gardens as a UNESCO World Heritage Site.

History
The original garden was built by Lu Jin, prefect of Baoning district, in 1874.  It was purchased by Shen Bingcheng, the magistrate of Susong. who rebuilt it in its current form.  He also changed the name to the Couple's Garden Retreat. This name refers to the garden's two parts and alludes to a couple. It is recognized with other classical Suzhou gardens as a UNESCO World Heritage Site.

Design
The 0.33 ha garden is divided into an east and west section by the residential core in the middle; an unusual composition for a classical garden.  The eccentric design is continued in the form and details of many of the garden buildings, especially the Taoism Tower.  The garden is located in the intersection of canals and is surrounded by water on three sides.  It is accessible directly from the canal by boat.  The West garden is composed of several structures grouped around a small grotto and a Library annex.  It is structurally joined to the central residence.  East Garden is the main garden of the complex.  It consists of a grotto and pond ringed by a covered walkway that connects the structures.  A smaller fruit orchard annex is attached.

See also
Chinese garden
Suzhou

Notes

References

External links

Classical Gardens of Suzhou, UNESCO's official website on World Heritage Site.
Couple's Garden Retreat at Asian Historical Architecture.

Classical Gardens of Suzhou
Major National Historical and Cultural Sites in Jiangsu